Drese is a surname. Notable people with the surname include:

Adam Drese (1620–1701), German composer, kapellmeister and bass viol player of the baroque period
Claus Helmut Drese (1922–2011), German opera and theatre administrator and author 
Johann Samuel Drese (c. 1644–1716),  German composer and member of the musical Drese family
Johann Wilhelm Drese (1677–1745), German composer, son of Samuel Drese
Ryan Drese (born 1976), American former professional baseball pitcher

References